David T. Prosser Jr. (born December 24, 1942) is an American jurist and politician who served as Speaker of the Wisconsin State Assembly from 1995 to 1996, and as a justice of the Wisconsin Supreme Court from 1998 to 2016.

Following his graduation from University of Wisconsin Law School, Prosser worked in Washington as an attorney at the U.S. Department of Justice and as an aide to U. S. Representative Harold Vernon Froehlich. Returning to Wisconsin, he began a private practice, worked as a district attorney for two years, then served 18 years as a Republican party legislator in the Wisconsin State Assembly. He was the state house minority leader for six of those years and Speaker of the Assembly for two years. 

After an unsuccessful bid for the U.S. House in 1996, Prosser was appointed by Wisconsin Governor Tommy Thompson to a vacant seat on the state tax appeals board, then in 1998 to a vacant seat on Wisconsin Supreme Court. He was elected to his first 10-year term without opposition in 2001. He ran for reelection in April 2011 against little-known Wisconsin assistant attorney general JoAnne Kloppenburg. The race received national attention and was viewed as a referendum on efforts by Republican Governor Scott Walker and the Republican-controlled legislature to curb the union rights of public workers in Wisconsin. The April 5, 2011 election was too close to call until two days later when the Waukesha County Clerk announced she had erroneously omitted more than 14,000 votes from her earlier tally. The additional votes gave Prosser a lead of over 7,000 which was sustained by a later recount.

Prosser received media attention in 2010 following verbal altercations with the chief justice of the Wisconsin Supreme Court, and also in June 2011 when allegations were made of a physical altercation between Prosser and fellow associate justice Ann Walsh Bradley that occurred in connection with the union-curbing bill. A special prosecutor investigated but declined to press criminal charges. An ethics action against Prosser was recommended by the Wisconsin Judicial Commission, however, after three other justices recused themselves from the matter, no further action was taken.

Early life and education
Prosser was born in Chicago, Illinois to David T. Prosser Sr. and his wife Elizabeth (Patterson) Prosser, and was raised in Appleton, Wisconsin. After graduating from Appleton High School, he attended DePauw University, receiving his B.A. in 1965. He went on to law school at the University of Wisconsin and received his J.D. in 1968.

Career

Early career
Prosser lectured at Indiana University-Indianapolis Law School from 1968 to 1969, before working from 1969 to 1972 in Washington, D.C. as an attorney advisor in the Office of Criminal Justice, U.S. Department of Justice. He ran unsuccessfully for a seat in the Wisconsin General Assembly in 1973, then served as an administrative assistant to U.S. Representative Harold Vernon Froehlich, a Republican member of the House Judiciary Committee from 1973 to 1974 during the Watergate impeachment hearings. After two years in private practice as a self-employed lawyer, Prosser served as Outagamie County District Attorney from 1977 to 1978.

Wisconsin legislature
Prosser represented the Appleton area in the Wisconsin State Assembly as a Republican from 1979 through 1996. His committee assignments included Criminal Justice and Public Safety and Judiciary. During his tenure in the Assembly, he served six years as Minority leader and two years as Speaker.

In 1981, he opposed removing criminal penalties on sexual activity and cohabitation between unmarried, consulting adults, though he did express a willingness to repeal the jail terms. He stated that legalizing sex outside of marriage would increase divorce rates, the number of children born outside of wedlock, welfare payments, sexually transmitted diseases, and abortions. In 1995, while he was Assembly Speaker, Prosser led the push for the new baseball stadium for the Milwaukee Brewers, saying that Wisconsin had a choice of being either a "big league or bush league" state.

Campaign for U.S. Congress
In 1996 he ran for the 8th congressional district seat in the U.S. Congress vacated by retiring U.S. Representative Toby Roth. Prosser won what the Milwaukee Journal Sentinel described as a "bitter and high-spending" primary, but was defeated in the general election by Democrat Jay W. Johnson. One month later, Governor Thompson appointed Prosser to the Wisconsin Tax Appeals Commission where he conducted hearings and ruled on disputes related to state taxation.

Wisconsin Supreme Court
In September 1998, Thompson appointed Prosser to a vacant seat on the Wisconsin Supreme Court, hailing him as a conservative. In an unusual move, a bipartisan group of 77 of the 132 state legislators sent a letter to Thompson supporting the appointment, describing Prosser as, "learned, thoughtful, and fiercely defensive of our system of law".

In 2011, the Milwaukee Journal Sentinel said Prosser is a "reliable judicial conservative, but he's also independent", citing an August 2010 Wisconsin Law Journal analysis which concluded "Prosser voted with no justice more than 85% of the time, though he generally combined with three other conservative justices (Michael Gableman, Patience Roggensack, and Annette Ziegler), to form a 4-3 majority on the court. The New York Times said some observers believe that Prosser is a member of a conservative 4-3 bloc on the court.

In October 2010, Prosser indicated that he supported limiting free online access to Wisconsin trial court records because the information can be misused by employers and landlords, saying, "Some people are actually innocent, and they shouldn't be disadvantaged forever" by the online records. Opponents of the change argued that restricting free online access may result in private vendors selling the information, and may conflict with Wisconsin's open records law.

Following the decision in Donohoo v. Action Wisconsin Inc., Prosser voted to amend the state's judicial code of conduct to allow judges to decide cases involving their campaign contributors, saying there are various levels of support and a campaign contribution or endorsement "in and of itself does not create so close or special relationship so as to require automatic recusal." He has also said his policy is not to recuse himself from cases involving lawmakers he has served with in the past unless the case is actually about the lawmakers.

Prosser retired from the Wisconsin Supreme Court on July 31, 2016.

Other professional activities
Prosser served as a member of the Wisconsin Council of Criminal Justice (1980–1983), the Judicial Council Commission on Preliminary Examinations (1981), the Wisconsin Sentencing Commission (1984–1988, 1994–1995), the Wisconsin Sesquicentennial Commission (1993–1999), and the National Conference of Commissioners on Uniform State Laws (1983–1996).

Controversies

Decision not to prosecute abuse case
In 1978, while serving as District Attorney of Outagamie County, Prosser declined to prosecute a Catholic priest accused of sexual abuse by two brothers (ages 12 and 14), who said the priest had touched their chests and unsuccessfully attempted to touch lower. Prosser later explained he did not file charges because the case was weak; it involved relatively new sexual assault laws that were untested at the time, and he did not think he could win a jury trial. He said he had assumed the priest, John Patrick Feeney, would be reassigned as a result of his discussion with Feeney's bishop. The priest was not removed from duties which allowed him contact with children, and he went on to abuse other children before being sent to prison on a 15-year sentence in 2004. The prosecutor who ultimately and successfully prosecuted the case in the early 2000s said that when Prosser had the case in the 1970s, he was lacking sufficient information: "We were able to gather a wealth of information that far exceeded what Prosser had," he said, adding, "It's not fair to second-guess him now." When interviewed in 2011 one of the victims said that in 1978 he and his brother had not communicated detailed information about the abuse to the authorities, and that when the case came to trial in 2002, Prosser helped in the prosecution.

During Prosser's 2011 run for re-election to the Wisconsin Supreme Court, the incident was revived in a political ad by a pro-union organization which claimed that Prosser did not investigate the abuse allegations and participated in a coverup. The ad was ultimately rated "Mostly False" by the fact-checking website, PolitiFact.com, which concluded that the ad omitted critical facts and created false impressions. One of the abuse victims, who had been critical of Prosser's decision not to prosecute, criticized the ad as "offensive, inaccurate and out of context." Prosser asked his opponent, Kloppenburg, to call for the removal of the ad—she replied that the First Amendment gave the group the right to run such ads.

Assembly staffers used for campaigning
In 2006, Prosser testified on behalf of Wisconsin State Representative Scott Jensen who was being tried on three felony counts of misconduct in office because his legislative staffers also performed campaign activity on his behalf. Prosser stated that during seven years of his own tenure in the Wisconsin Assembly, he had used his taxpayer-funded staff for campaigning—the same crime Jensen was eventually convicted of. Prosser was not charged, and defended the actions saying, "it was a different era and public expectations were quite different". However critics described this as illegal activity, and the Appleton Post Crescent, Prosser's hometown paper, found Prosser's admissions sufficient reason to endorse Prosser's opponent in the 2011 election, saying Prosser fell short of having the "unimpeachable integrity" required of a high court judge because he had admittedly "condoned illegal activity" while serving as an elected official.

Altercations with other justices
During a closed-door debate between the justices on February 10, 2010, Prosser called Chief Justice Shirley Abrahamson "a total bitch" and threatened to "destroy her". A review of emails by the Milwaukee Journal Sentinel indicated that "justices on both sides described the court as dysfunctional, and Prosser and others suggested bringing in a third party for help". The 2010 conflict on the court was also criticized as having a potential for lowering court productivity and distracting the focus of the justices. Prosser admitted he overreacted, but justified his statements, saying he had been goaded, bullied and abused by two other justices for a long time, and that the fights were caused by liberal members of the court "ganging up" on him and attempting to create a "foul atmosphere". He also said the March 2011 revelations of the year-old altercation were an attempt to hurt his bid for re-election. When interviewed in March 2011, Justice Ann Walsh Bradley acknowledged Prosser had had outbursts over the years, but said there had not been one of significant magnitude since February 2010. She also commented that, "he is a good man - but you cannot accurately say he has a steady, even temperament."

Conflicting media reports on June 25, 2011 indicated that Prosser had gotten into an altercation with Bradley on June 13, 2011 in her office, which allegedly became physical. The dispute occurred during a discussion in Bradley's office with four other Justices present, before the court issued its June 13, 2011 split decision to uphold the law limiting collective bargaining rights for most Wisconsin state public employees. In one report, witnesses alleged that after Bradley told Prosser to leave her office, Prosser grabbed Bradley around the neck in what was described as a chokehold.  A contradictory report said that Bradley charged Prosser with her fist raised, and that in attempting to block her, he made contact with her neck. Capitol Police Chief Charles Tubbs was notified of the incident, and met with the entire Supreme Court. Investigations into the matter were opened by the Wisconsin Judicial Commission and the Dane County Sheriff's office. After initially saying he would refrain from comment until a proper investigation was completed, Prosser denied he choked Bradley saying, "claims made to the media will be proven false." Bradley then made a public statement saying that Prosser, "put his hands around my neck in anger in a chokehold", as she was asking him to leave her office.

The Dane County Sheriff's office gave its findings to county District Attorney Ismael Ozanne, who referred the matter to special prosecutor Patricia Barrett; Barrett ultimately ruled in late August 2011 that the circumstances and evidence reviewed did not support the filing of criminal charges. On March 16, 2012, the Wisconsin Judicial Commission filed an ethics complaint against Prosser, "recommending that the court discipline him for alleged misconduct", however, three conservative members of the court recused themselves from the matter, with the result that no quorum existed, and no decision could be made.

Failure to recuse during "John Doe" probe of Scott Walker 
Leaked files obtained by the Guardian revealed that a network of dark money groups spent $3.5 million to pay for TV and radio ads backing the judge during his 2011 campaign. According to these leaked emails "The push was seen as vital, the documents disclose, as a means of retaining the rightwing majority of the court and thereby preserving the anti-union measures introduced by Walker. 'If we lose [Justice Prosser], the Walker agenda is toast,' one ally writes in an email sent around to the governor’s chief of staff and several conservative lobbyists." In 2015, a John Doe probe into Scott Walker's funding sources during the 2012 recall campaign against him involved the same set groups that funded Prosser's 2011 campaign.  Despite the obvious possible conflicts of interest, Prosser refused to recuse himself, ultimately casting the deciding vote to terminate the probe. Prosser told the Guardian that four years had passed since his re-election before he joined the decision to close the John Doe investigation, over which time any potential conflict of interest had faded.

2011 re-election campaign

Prosser faced JoAnne Kloppenburg, a long-time but little-known Wisconsin assistant attorney general, in both the February 5, 2011 spring primary, and the April 5 run-off election.

Primary election
In December 2010, Prosser's campaign director expressed strong support for governor-elect Walker, saying Prosser's "personal ideology more closely mirrors" Walker's, and that a win by Prosser would result in, "protecting the conservative judicial majority and acting as a common sense complement to both the new administration and Legislature." He later disavowed the statements and claimed he had not seen the release. Prosser's campaign manager also said that, "This election is about a 4-3 commonsense conservative majority vs. a 3-4 liberal majority, and nothing more."

In a survey of attorneys conducted by the Milwaukee Bar Association that was published February 2011, Prosser received more votes saying he was "qualified" than any of his opponents; besting Kloppenburg by a margin of 296 to 112. He was endorsed in the Milwaukee Journal Sentinel, and the Sun Prairie Star. He won the primary handily, receiving 231,000 votes to second-place finisher Kloppenburg's 105,000 votes; a 30% margin.

General election
In the general election of April 5, 2011, Prosser again faced Kloppenburg. The contest received considerable attention due to the 2011 Wisconsin protests of Walker's budget repair bill and limitations on public employee bargaining rights; issues which would likely soon come before the Wisconsin Supreme Court. Kloppenburg supporters attempted to tie Prosser to the policies of Republican governor Scott Walker, and his March 2011 law limiting most of Wisconsin's public employees' collective bargaining rights. The non-partisan race for the court seat was also characterized as a proxy battle or referendum on the administration of Governor Walker and other Republican officials. Both candidates stated their unhappiness regarding the increased partisan aspect of the race, with Prosser claiming that if he was defeated, it would mean the end of judicial independence.

On March 31, Prosser's campaign co-chair, former Democratic governor Patrick Lucey, resigned from the campaign and endorsed Kloppenburg, saying it appeared that Prosser had lost his impartiality, and was showing "a disturbing distemper and lack of civility that does not bode well for the High Court".

The Wausau Daily Herald reversed its primary election endorsement, and urged its readers to vote against Prosser in the general, describing him as "an intemperate figure given to partisan rhetoric". Citing the earlier statement of Prosser's campaign director that the election is about maintaining a conservative majority on the court, The Capital Times endorsed Kloppenburg. Prosser was endorsed by the Sun Prairie Star, The Milwaukee Journal-Sentinel, and former Alaska governor Sarah Palin (via Twitter), among others for the general election.

State officials predicted a voter turnout of around 20 percent, a typical level of turnout for an April election. However, voter interest and turnout were unusually high with nearly 1.5 million votes cast.

Result
The day after the election, Kloppenburg was thought to be ahead by a razor-thin margin of 204-votes, leading her to prematurely declare victory. Late in the afternoon of April 7, Waukesha County Clerk Kathy Nickolaus announced that the preliminary vote totals she had given to the Associated Press on April 6 did not include 14,315 votes from Brookfield, her county's second largest city and one of the most Republican. The announcement changed the unofficial total, giving Prosser a lead of over 7,000 votes which likely would not be changed by a recount. Other, much smaller errors in the preliminary count were found in other counties favoring both candidates. A final vote canvass of all the counties in Wisconsin gave Prosser an official lead of 7,316 votes on April 15. Kloppenburg did request a recount at taxpayer expense (costing as much as $500,000) and Prosser was eventually declared the winner by 7,006 votes.

New York Times analyst Nate Silver declared on April 8 that Nickolaus' error pointed to incompetence, not conspiracy. However, Democrats called on Nickolaus to resign, citing her previous employment under Prosser in the mid-1990s as a member of the assembly caucus and questions about her procedures and counts in prior elections. State election officials announced an investigation of possible voting irregularities going back to 2006.

Electoral history

References

External links
 
 
 The 118-page police dossier on the July 13 incident released in August 2011,  a word-searchable 70-page version that only includes the interview reports, and  12 pages of the most relevant excerpts.

1942 births
Living people
DePauw University alumni
District attorneys in Wisconsin
Lawyers from Chicago
Politicians from Appleton, Wisconsin
Politicians from Chicago
Speakers of the Wisconsin State Assembly
Republican Party members of the Wisconsin State Assembly
United States congressional aides
University of Wisconsin–Madison alumni
University of Wisconsin Law School alumni
Justices of the Wisconsin Supreme Court